The 2023 Viterra Championship, Manitoba's provincial men's curling championship, was held from February 8 to 12 at the Yellowstone Community Recreation Centre in Neepawa, Manitoba. The winning Matt Dunstone rink represented Manitoba at the 2023 Tim Hortons Brier ain London, Ontario where they finished with a silver medal after losing in the final to Team Canada 7–5. The only two losses in the Brier by the Dunstone rink came against Team Canada.

Despite losing in the final, the Reid Carruthers rink still qualified for the Brier as the Wild Card #2 representative based on CTRS standings, where they finished fifth in Pool A with a 4–4 record.

Qualification process
Source:

Teams
The teams are listed as follows:

Knockout Brackets
Source:

32 team double knockout with playoff round
Four teams qualify each from A Event and B Event

A event

B event

Knockout Results
All draw times listed in Central Time (UTC−06:00).

Draw 1
Wednesday, February 8, 8:30 am

Draw 2
Wednesday, February 8, 12:15 pm

Draw 3
Wednesday, February 8, 4:00 pm

Draw 4
Wednesday, February 8, 8:00 pm

Draw 5
Thursday, February 9, 8:30 am

Draw 6
Thursday, February 9, 12:15 pm

Draw 7
Thursday, February 9, 4:00 pm

Draw 8
Thursday, February 9, 7:45 pm

Draw 9
Friday, February 10, 8:30 am

Draw 10
Friday, February 10, 12:15 pm

Draw 11
Friday, February 10, 4:00 pm

Playoff Bracket
Source: 

8 team double knockout
Four teams qualify into Championship Round

A bracket

B bracket

Playoff Round Results
Source:

Draw 12
Friday, February 10, 7:45 pm

Draw 13
Saturday, February 11, 9:00 am

Draw 14
Saturday, February 11, 1:30 pm

Championship Round

1 vs. 2
Saturday, February 11, 6:00 pm

3 vs. 4
Saturday, February 11, 6:00 pm

Semifinal
Sunday, February 12, 9:00 am

Final
Sunday, February 12, 2:30 pm

Notes

References

External links
Official site

Viterra
Curling in Manitoba
2023 in Manitoba
Viterra Championship